The Howard Morrison Quartet (originally named the Ohinemutu Quartet) was a New Zealand band during the 1950s and early 1960s. The band was formed by Sir Howard Morrison and included Gerry Merito, Wi Wharekura and Noel Kingi.

In 1955, while working as a surveyor's chainman, Howard Morrison started putting together vocal groups to entertain at rugby club socials in Rotorua. In 1956 he toured Australia as a member of the Aotearoa Concert Party. 
  
On his return, he heard guitarist Gerry Merito and put together a group with Gerry and two others, Wi Wharekura and Noel Kingi, and named the group Howard Morrison Quartet. In 1958, they became part of Benny Levin's touring 'Pop Jamboree.' A recording they made of "Hoki Mai/ Po Karekare Ana" sold well, and in 1959 their parody of "The Battle of New Orleans," recorded as "The Battle of the Waikato", became one of their biggest hits.

In 1960, they were so popular their managers released 13 singles, three EPs and two albums. Another parody of Lonnie Donegan's, "My Old Man's A Dustman" was rewritten by Gerry Merito as "My Old Man's An All Black." This was highly topical, because of the huge controversy over Maoris not being allowed to tour South Africa with that year's All Blacks.

Moving into 1962, two of their singles were more parodies, with Ray Stevens' "Ahab The Arab" becoming "Mori The Hori" and Pat Boone's "Speedy Gonzales" becoming "George The Wilder Colonial Boy", celebrating the exploits of escaped convict George Wilder.

Due to the constant touring and absence from families, the quartet disbanded in 1965, but have occasionally re-united in various incarnations over the subsequent years.

Incarnations 
1956-1957 (The Ohinemutu "Quartet")
Sir Howard Morrison
John Morrison
Terry Morrison
Wi Wharekura
Chubby Hamiora
Gary Rangiihu

1957-1958
Sir Howard Morrison
Gerry Merito
Laurie Morrison
John Morrison

1958-1959
Sir Howard Morrison
Gerry Merito
Laurie Morrison
Tai Eru

1959-1960
Sir Howard Morrison
Gerry Merito
Wi Wharekura
Eddie Howell

1960-1965, 1975 (Return of a Legend), 1989 (This Is Your Life: Sir Howard Morrison) (classic line-up)
Sir Howard Morrison
Gerry Merito
Wi Wharekura
Noel Kingi

1979 (Tu Tangata '79)
Sir Howard Morrison
Gerry Merito
Toni Wiliams
Noel Kingi

1992-199?
Sir Howard Morrison
Gerry Merito
Toni Williams
Hori Bennett

1995 (Sir Howard Morrison: Time of My Life)
Sir Howard Morrison
Gerry Merito
Terry Morrison
Tai Eru

Note: this incarnation played part of the Quartet segment of the show before Terry Morrison and Tai Eru gave way to Toni Williams and Hori Bennett, thus reverting to the previous incarnation. After this incarnation played some songs Terry and Tai rejoined them on stage for the finale of the segment.

2006 (A Knight with a Dame)
Sir Howard Morrison
Gerry Merito
Howard Morrison Jr.
Temuera Morrison

2008 (To Sir With Love)
Sir Howard Morrison
Gerry Merito
Wi Wharekura
Toni Williams

2009 (Good Morning)
Sir Howard Morrison
Toni Williams
Hori Bennett
Howard Morrison Jr.

References

External links
AudioCulture profile

Musical groups established in 1956
New Zealand musical groups
1956 establishments in New Zealand
New Zealand Māori musical groups
Māori-language singers